Martin Schröder   in an inorganic chemist. He is Vice President and Dean for the Faculty of Science and Engineering and Professor of Chemistry in the Department of Chemistry at the University of Manchester since June 2015. He served previously as Executive Dean of the Faculty of Science from 2011 to 2015 and Professor of Inorganic Chemistry at the University of Nottingham from 1995 to 2015.

Early life and education
Martin Schröder was born in Taplow, Buckinghamshire of Estonian refugee parents in 1954, and was educated at Montem Primary School and Slough Grammar School. He is first in family to attend university, and was awarded a Bachelor of Science degree in chemistry from the University of Sheffield in 1975 and a PhD from Imperial College London in 1978 where his research on oxo complexes of osmium and ruthenium was supervised by William P. Griffith.

Career and research

After postdoctoral fellowships at the ETH, Zürich with Albert Eschenmoser, funded by a Royal Society-Swiss National Foundation Fellowship, and at the University of Cambridge with Jack Lewis, he was appointed to a senior demonstratorship at the University of Edinburgh in 1982. He was subsequently promoted to lecturer, reader and then professor, and in 1995 was appointed to the University of Nottingham as head and professor of inorganic chemistry. He served as head of the School of Chemistry at the University of Nottingham from 1999 to 2005, and as executive dean of the Faculty of Science (2011–2015). In 2015 he moved to his current position as vice-president and dean of the Faculty of Science and Engineering and professor of chemistry at the University of Manchester. 

He has been a visiting professor at the University of Toronto, Canada, the University of Otago, Dunedin, New Zealand and the Université Louis Pasteur, Strasbourg, France, and has published over 540 publications and patents. 
His early independent research focussed on the chemistry of transition metal thioether and aza macrocyclic complexes with particular focus on the stabilisation of unusual oxidation state species. This work led to the isolation and characterisation of unique mononuclear M(I)/(III) (M = Ni, Pd, Pt) and M(II) (M = Ag, Au, Rh, Ir) complexes. His current research focuses on the development of new advanced functional materials, particularly metal-organic framework materials for selective fuel and toxic gas capture, purification and catalysis.

Controversy
In 2021, Schröder sent an email to Christopher Jackson in his capacity as a Vice President of the University of Manchester, linking to a right wing website GB News and disputing the presence of institutional racism at the University of Manchester. Jackson has subsequently left the institution, and Schröder has declined to apologise.

Awards and honours
In 1994 he was elected Fellow of the Royal Society of Edinburgh (FRSE) and Fellow of the Royal Society of Chemistry (FRSC), and in 2016 he was elected Member of Academia Europaea (MAE). He is currently a Member of Council of the Engineering and Physical Sciences Research Council (EPSRC). He has held a Leverhulme Trust Senior Research Fellowship, and has Honorary Degrees from Tallinn Technical University and from Nikolaev Institute of Inorganic Chemistry, Russian Academy of Sciences. In 2020, he was awarded the Nyholm Prize for Inorganic Chemistry by the Royal Society of Chemistry.

References

1954 births
Alumni of the University of Sheffield
Alumni of Imperial College London
Fellows of the Royal Society of Chemistry
Fellows of the Royal Society of Edinburgh
Academics of the University of Nottingham
Academics of the University of Edinburgh
Members of Academia Europaea
People educated at Upton Court Grammar School
Living people
British people of Estonian descent
British chemists
Inorganic chemists